The Hanwell Band was a brass band formed in Hanwell, near Ealing, in 1891.  It was first known as the Hanwell Town Band but after success in competition it was renamed the Hanwell Prize Band. Another competition win in 1913 in Tottenham expanded the name to the Hanwell Silver Prize Band.  In 1979, sponsorship by Roneo Vickers resulted in another name change to the Roneo Vickers Band but the company soon folded. In 1983 the name reverted to The Hanwell Band but the band did not long survive the loss of sponsorship.

Recordings
 The band played on Peter Skellern's 1973 hit You're a Lady 
 The Floral Dance (1978) – a chart success with Terry Wogan as the vocalist
 The theme tune to the BBC television series That's Life!

References

British brass bands
Hanwell